Bernard "Beb" Guérin (December 22, 1941 in La Rochelle – November 14, 1980 in Paris) was a French jazz double-bassist.

Beb Guérin first began playing bass at age 23, working in the 1960s with Sonny Criss, Jacques Coursil, François Tusques, Alan Silva, and Claude Delcloo later in the decade, as well as with free jazz groups in Paris clubs. In the early 1970s he worked with Ambrose Jackson, Steve Lacy, Sunny Murray, Sonny Sharrock, Archie Shepp, Alan Shorter, and Clifford Thornton, and worked frequently with Michel Portal for most of the 1970s.

References

French jazz double-bassists
Male double-bassists
1941 births
1980 deaths
20th-century double-bassists
20th-century French male musicians
French male jazz musicians